Maritim Plaza Tirana is a luxury hotel in Tirana, Albania owned by German Maritim hotel chain. It is located on 28 Nëntori Street, near the Skanderbeg Square. 

The hotel building is also known as the TID Tower, after the Tirana International Development corporation that originally commissioned its construction. The design comes from Belgian architectural firm 51N4E, and construction started on 14 January 2007. "The building is designed as a constellation of 3 singular buildings: the tower of 85 m height coming down to the ground, a 5 story glass building with a cantilevering roof that creates a public open air galleria; and a concrete building with a hollowed out quarter dome, embracing the tomb of Suleiman Pasha [sic; actually the Kapllan Pasha Tomb]." The TID Tower's architectural design is notable for its sensitive incorporation of the Kapllan Pasha Tomb, tucked in a void in one of the complex’s low-slung concrete buildings, and for its use of concrete panels cast on-site. The building design was featured in the 15th Venice Architecture Biennale in 2016.

Tirana is the highest building of Albania.

See also
 List of tallest buildings in Albania
 Landmarks in Tirana
 Kapllan Pasha Tomb

References

Skyscrapers in Albania
Buildings and structures in Tirana
Architecture in Albania
Tourism in Albania
Tourist attractions in Tirana
Hotels in Albania
Hotels established in 2015
Hotel buildings completed in 2015